Charlevoix County may refer to:
Charlevoix County, Michigan, a county in Michigan
Charlevoix-Est Regional County Municipality, a regional county municipality in Quebec
Charlevoix Regional County Municipality, a regional county municipality in Quebec